Serigne Mor Mbaye (born 3 January 1996) is a Senegalese footballer who plays as a goalkeeper for Norwegian club Sogndal, on loan from Kristiansund.

Career

Club
On 15 February 2019, Mbaye returned to Kristiansund on a one-year contract, signing a new three-year contract with Kristiansund on 14 February 2020. Following Sean McDermott's injury at the onset of the 2020 season, Mbaye became first-choice goalkeeper.

Career statistics

References

External links

1996 births
Living people
Senegalese footballers
Kristiansund BK players
Hamarkameratene players
Eliteserien players
Norwegian First Division players
Senegalese expatriate footballers
Expatriate footballers in Norway
Senegalese expatriate sportspeople in Norway
Association football goalkeepers